Gray Matters or Grey Matters may refer to:

 Gray Matters (novel), by William Hjortsberg
 Gray Matters (2006 film), a film directed by Sue Kramer
 Gray Matters (2014 film), a documentary film by Marco Orsini
 Gray Matters (record label)
 "Gray Matters" (Johnny Bravo), a 2004 episode of Johnny Bravo
 "Grey Matters" (Fringe)

See also
 Grey Matter (disambiguation)